Francesco Riefolo (born March 20, 1941 in Bari) is a retired Italian professional football player.

External links
Profile at Enciclopedia del Calcio

1941 births
Living people
Italian footballers
Serie A players
Inter Milan players
Vis Pesaro dal 1898 players
Association football defenders